Herry Janto Setiawan (10 August 1973 – 10 October 2013) was an Indonesian cyclist. He competed in the track time trial at the 1992 Summer Olympics.

References

1973 births
2013 deaths
Indonesian male cyclists
Olympic cyclists of Indonesia
Cyclists at the 1992 Summer Olympics
Place of birth missing